Central Labour Camp Jaworzno
Gulag
Borovichi camp
Forced labor of Germans in the Soviet Union - ethnic Poles were among "German" forced workers